Kokkoris is a Greek surname. Notable people with the surname include:

 Aristidis Kokkoris (born 1998), Greek footballer
 Hristos Kokkoris (born 1942), Greek chess master

Greek-language surnames